State Route 202 (SR 202) is a primary state highway in the U.S. state of Virginia. Known for most of its length as Cople Highway, the state highway runs  from SR 3 at Templeman east to U.S. Route 360 (US 360) in Callao. SR 202 connects several small communities in eastern Westmoreland County with western Northumberland County.

Route description

SR 202 begins at an intersection with SR 3 (Kings Highway) at Templeman. The state highway heads northeast as Cople Highway, which crosses tidewater Nomini Creek and curves southeast at the hamlet of Nomini. SR 202 passes through Machodoc and Hague on its way to Grays Corner, where the highway intersects SR 203 (Oldhams Road). The two highways run concurrently until SR 203 splits northeast as Kinsale Road. SR 202 crosses the Westmoreland–Northumberland county line at its bridge over Hampton Hall Branch of the West Branch of the Yeocomico River. The state highway continues as Hampton Hall Road, which heads south past Morrisons Corner and southeast from Hyacinth to its eastern terminus at US 360 in the village of Callao. The roadway continues east as Northumberland Highway toward the namesake county's seat of Heathsville. US 360 also heads west from the intersection as Richmond Road.

Major intersections

References

External links

Virginia Highways Project: VA 202

202
State Route 202
State Route 202